The MS-500V is a Ukrainian family of military and civilian turboshaft engines developed by Motor Sich. The new engine is intended for helicopters with a takeoff weight up to 6 tonnes. Its certification is scheduled for the first quarter of 2011, and it will power the new Kazan Ansat-U training helicopter, currently equipped with the Pratt & Whitney Canada PW207K engine.

Applications
 Kazan Ansat
 PZL W-3

Specifications (MS-500V)

See also

References

External links

Motor-Sich company website

2000s turboshaft engines
Motor Sich